is a Japanese water polo player. She was selected to the Japan women's national water polo team, for the 2020 Summer Olympics.

She participated at the  2019 Summer Universiade, 2019 FINA World Women's Junior Waterpolo Championships, and 2019 FINA Women's Water Polo World League.

References 

2001 births
Living people
Japanese female water polo players
Olympic water polo players of Japan
Water polo players at the 2020 Summer Olympics
21st-century Japanese women